The Lonely Profession, also known as The Savarona Syndrome, is a 1969 American crime drama television film directed and written by Douglas Heyes, based on his 1963 novel The Twelfth of Never. It stars Harry Guardino as Leo Gordon, a private investigator who seeks the killer of a tycoon's mistress and becomes a suspect.

Plot
Private investigator Leo Gordon is hired to trail Karen Mendaros, the mistress of a reclusive billionaire. When they meet, Gordon and Mendaros hit it off and check in at a motel. Gordon wakes up the next morning and discovers that Mendaros had been murdered during the night. Gordon opens his own investigation of Mendaros' past in an attempt to determine who killed Mendaros and why he's been set up as the fall guy.

Main cast

References

External links
 
 

1969 television films
1969 films
American detective films
NBC network original films
1969 drama films
Films directed by Douglas Heyes
1960s American films